John Swaffer (10 November 1851 – 26 July 1936) was an English cricketer who played in one first-class cricket match for Kent County Cricket Club during the 1873 season.

Swaffer was born in Ruckinge in Kent in 1851. His only known appearance for Kent came against Lancashire in July 1873 at Gravesend. He died in 1936 at Orsett in Essex aged 84.

References

External links

1851 births
1936 deaths
English cricketers
Kent cricketers
People from the Borough of Ashford